Massachusetts Senate's 2nd Middlesex and Norfolk district in the United States is one of 40 legislative districts of the Massachusetts Senate. It covers 8.9% of Middlesex County and 3.7% of Norfolk County population. Democrat Karen Spilka of Ashland has represented the district since 2005.

Locales represented
The district includes the following localities:
 Ashland
 Framingham
 part of Franklin
 Holliston
 Hopkinton
 Medway
 part of Natick

The current district geographic boundary overlaps with those of the Massachusetts House of Representatives' 5th Middlesex, 6th Middlesex, 7th Middlesex, 8th Middlesex, 13th Middlesex, 10th Norfolk, and 10th Worcester districts.

Senators 
 David H. Locke
 Jack H. Backman, 1979-1987 
 Lois Pines
 David P. Magnani, circa 2002 
 Karen E. Spilka, 2005-current

See also
 List of Massachusetts Senate elections
 List of Massachusetts General Courts
 List of former districts of the Massachusetts Senate
 Middlesex County districts of the Massachusetts House of Representatives: 1st, 2nd, 3rd, 4th, 5th, 6th, 7th, 8th, 9th, 10th, 11th, 12th, 13th, 14th, 15th, 16th, 17th, 18th, 19th, 20th, 21st, 22nd, 23rd, 24th, 25th, 26th, 27th, 28th, 29th, 30th, 31st, 32nd, 33rd, 34th, 35th, 36th, 37th
 Norfolk County districts of the Massachusetts House of Representatives: 1st, 2nd, 3rd, 4th, 5th, 6th, 7th, 8th, 9th, 10th, 11th, 12th, 13th, 14th, 15th

References

External links
 Ballotpedia
  (State Senate district information based on U.S. Census Bureau's American Community Survey).

Senate
Government of Middlesex County, Massachusetts
Government of Norfolk County, Massachusetts
Massachusetts Senate